The 1958–59 season was Mansfield Town's 21st season in the Football League and 1st season in the newly formed Third Division, they finished in 20th position with 46 points, avoiding relegation by 5 points.

Final league table

Results

Football League Third Division

FA Cup

Squad statistics
 Squad list sourced from

References
General
 Mansfield Town 1958–59 at soccerbase.com (use drop down list to select relevant season)

Specific

Mansfield Town F.C. seasons
Mansfield Town